This is a list of individual records recognized by the National Hockey League (NHL) through the end of the 2021–22 NHL season.

Seasons
Most seasons: Gordie Howe (1946–47 to 1970–71; 1979–80) and Chris Chelios (1983–84 to 2009–10, except for the 2004–05 NHL lockout), 26
Most playoff seasons: Chris Chelios (1983–84 to 2008–09, except for 1997–98 and the 2004–05 NHL lockout), 24
Most consecutive playoff seasons: Larry Robinson (1972–73 to 1991–92) and Nicklas Lidstrom (1991–92 to 2011–12, except for the 2004–05 NHL lockout), 20

Games
Most games: Patrick Marleau, 1,779
Most games, including playoffs: Mark Messier, 1,992
Most playoff games: Chris Chelios, 266
Most games played in a single NHL season, not including playoffs: Jimmy Carson (1992–93) and Bob Kudelski (1993–94), 86
Most consecutive games: Keith Yandle (March 26, 2009 - March 29, 2022), 989 
Most games played in the NHL without playing in the playoffs (retired): Guy Charron, 734
Most games played in the NHL before playing in a playoff game: Ron Hainsey, 907
Most games coached in the Stanley Cup Final: Dick Irvin, 77
Most games played in the Stanley Cup Final: Red Kelly and Henri Richard, 65
Most games won by a coach in the Stanley Cup Final: Scotty Bowman, 36
Most games coached by the first coach of an NHL expansion franchise: Barry Trotz (Nashville Predators), 1,196

Stanley Cup
Most Stanley Cup wins as a player: Henri Richard, 11
Most Stanley Cup wins as a non-player: Scotty Bowman, 14
Most Stanley Cup wins, combined player or non-player: Jean Beliveau, 17
Won the Stanley Cup with the highest number of different teams
Player: Jack Marshall and Hap Holmes, 4
Combined player/non-player: Al Arbour, 4
Non-player: Tommy Gorman and Scotty Bowman, 4

NHL Awards
Most Hart Memorial Trophies: Wayne Gretzky, 9
Most consecutive Hart Memorial Trophies: Wayne Gretzky, 8
Most Ted Lindsay Awards: Wayne Gretzky, 5
Most consecutive Ted Lindsay Awards: Wayne Gretzky, 4
Most Conn Smythe Trophies: Patrick Roy, 3
Most consecutive Conn Smythe Trophies: Bernie Parent, Mario Lemieux, and Sidney Crosby, 2
Most James Norris Trophies: Bobby Orr, 8
Most consecutive James Norris Trophies: Bobby Orr, 8
Most Maurice "Rocket" Richard Trophies: Alexander Ovechkin, 9
Most consecutive Maurice "Rocket" Richard Trophies: Alexander Ovechkin, 4
Most Art Ross Trophies: Wayne Gretzky, 10
Most consecutive Art Ross Trophies: Wayne Gretzky, 7
Most Frank J. Selke Trophies: Patrice Bergeron, 5
Most consecutive Frank J. Selke Trophies: Bob Gainey, 4
Most Lady Byng Trophies: Frank Boucher, 7
Most consecutive Lady Byng Trophies: Frank Boucher and Pavel Datsyuk, 4
Most William M. Jennings Trophies: Patrick Roy and Martin Brodeur, 5
Most consecutive William M. Jennings Trophies: Patrick Roy and Brian Hayward, 3
Most Vezina Trophies: Jacques Plante, 7
Most consecutive Vezina Trophies: Jacques Plante, 5
Most Jack Adams Awards: Pat Burns, 3
Most consecutive Jack Adams Awards: Jacques Demers, 2

Goals
Most career goals (regular season): Wayne Gretzky, 894
Most career goals (playoffs): Wayne Gretzky, 122
Most career goals (total): Wayne Gretzky, 1,016
Most goals, single season: Wayne Gretzky (1981–82), 92
Most goals, single season for a rookie: Teemu Selanne (1992–93), 76
Most goals, in single playoffs season: Reggie Leach (1976) and Jari Kurri (1985), 19
Most goals, single season including playoffs: Wayne Gretzky (1983–84), 100
Most goals, single playoff series: Jari Kurri (six-game series) (1985), 12
Most goals in a Stanley Cup Final series: Cyclone Taylor (1918, five games), Frank Foyston (1919, five games), and Babe Dye (1922, five games), 9
Most goals in the Stanley Cup Finals, career: Maurice Richard, 34
Most goals, 50 games from start of season: Wayne Gretzky (1981–82 and 1983–84), 61
Fastest 50 goals from start of season: Wayne Gretzky (December 30, 1981), 39 games
Most goals, one regular season game: Joe Malone (January 31, 1920), 7
Most goals, one regular season home game: Joe Malone (January 31, 1920), 7
Most goals, one regular season road game: Red Berenson (November 7, 1968), 6
Most goals, one playoff game: Newsy Lalonde (March 1, 1919), Maurice Richard (March 23, 1944), Darryl Sittler (April 22, 1976), Reggie Leach (May 6, 1976), and Mario Lemieux (April 25, 1989), 5
Most goals, one home playoff game: Maurice Richard (March 23, 1944), Darryl Sittler (April 22, 1976), Reggie Leach (May 6, 1976), and Mario Lemieux (April 25, 1989), 5
Most goals, one road playoff game: Newsy Lalonde (March 1, 1919), 5
Most goals, one regular season game for a rookie in their first game: Auston Matthews (October 12, 2016), 4
Most goals scored by a single player in an expansion team's inaugural season: William Karlsson (2017–18), 43
Most goals, one period: Max Bentley (January 28, 1943), Busher Jackson (November 20, 1934), Clint Smith (March 4, 1945), Red Berenson (November 7, 1968), Wayne Gretzky (February 18, 1981), Grant Mulvey (February 3, 1982), Bryan Trottier (February 13, 1982), Tim Kerr (April 13, 1985), Al Secord (January 7, 1987), Joe Nieuwendyk (January 11, 1989), Peter Bondra (February 5, 1994), Mario Lemieux (January 26, 1997), Patrick Marleau (January 23, 2017), and Tage Thompson (December 7, 2022), 4
Most goals, one playoff period: Tim Kerr (April 13, 1985) and Mario Lemieux (April 25, 1989), 4
Most goals in one period during the Stanley Cup Finals: Busher Jackson (April 5, 1932), Ted Lindsay (April 5, 1955), Maurice Richard (April 6, 1957), Wayne Gretzky (May 25, 1985), Dirk Graham (June 1, 1992), and Peter Forsberg (June 6, 1996), 3
Most goals in different ways: Mario Lemieux (December 31, 1988) full strength, powerplay, shorthanded, penalty shot and empty net, 5
Most game-winning goals in a single season: Phil Esposito (1970–71 and 1971–72) and Michel Goulet (1983–84), 16
Most game-winning goals in a single playoffs season: Brad Richards (2004), 7
Most game-winning goals in a playoff series: Mike Bossy (six-game series) (1983), 4
Most career game-winning goals: Jaromir Jagr, 135
Most career game-winning goals (playoffs): Wayne Gretzky and Brett Hull, 24

Assists
Most assists regular season career: Wayne Gretzky, 1,963
Most assists playoffs career: Wayne Gretzky 260
Most assists career, including playoffs: Wayne Gretzky, 2,223
Most assists, one season: Wayne Gretzky (1985–86), 163
Most assists, one playoff season: Wayne Gretzky (1987–88), 31
Most assists, one season, including playoffs: Wayne Gretzky (1985–86), 174
Most assists, playoff series: Leon Draisaitl (five-game series) (2022), 15
Most assists, one game: Billy Taylor (March 16, 1947) and Wayne Gretzky (February 15, 1980, December 11, 1985, and February 14, 1986), 7
Most assists, one home game: Wayne Gretzky (February 15, 1980, and February 14, 1986), 7
Most assists, one road game: Billy Taylor (March 16, 1947) and Wayne Gretzky (December 11, 1985), 7
Most assists, one playoff game: Mikko Leinonen (April 8, 1982), and Wayne Gretzky (April 9, 1987), 6
Most assists, one playoff home game: Mikko Leinonen (April 8, 1982), and Wayne Gretzky (April 9, 1987), 6
Most assists, one period: Dale Hawerchuk (March 6, 1984), 5

Points
Most points regular season career: Wayne Gretzky, 2,857
Most points playoff career: Wayne Gretzky, 382
Most points career, including playoffs: Wayne Gretzky, 3,239
Most points, one season: Wayne Gretzky (1985–86), 215
Fastest 100 points from the start of a season: Wayne Gretzky (December 27, 1981), 34 games
Most points, one season, including playoffs: Wayne Gretzky (1984–85), 255
Most points, one playoff season: Wayne Gretzky (1985), 47
Most points, one game: Darryl Sittler (February 7, 1976), 10
Most points, one home game: Darryl Sittler (February 7, 1976), 10
Most points, one road game: Peter Stastny and Anton Stastny, (February 22, 1981), 8
Most points, one playoff game: Patrik Sundstrom (April 22, 1988) and Mario Lemieux (April 25, 1989), 8
Most points, one playoff home game: Patrik Sundstrom (April 22, 1988) and Mario Lemieux (April 25, 1989), 8
Most points, one period: Bryan Trottier (December 23, 1978) and Mika Zibanejad (March 17, 2021), 6
Most points, one playoff series: Rick Middleton (seven-game series) (1983), 19
Most points, team's first postseason: Reilly Smith (2018), 22
Most points in the Finals, one series: Wayne Gretzky (1988), 13
Most points in the Finals, career: Jean Beliveau, 62

Plus/minus
Best ± rating, regular season career: Larry Robinson, +722
Best ± rating one season: Bobby Orr (1970–71), +124
Best ± rating one game: Tom Bladon (December 11, 1977, 11–1 game against the Cleveland Barons), +10
Worst ± rating, season: Bill Mikkelson (1974–75), -82
Worst ± rating, regular season game: Greg Joly (March 15, 1977), -9
Worst ± rating, regular season career: Bob Stewart, -257
Best ± rating playoffs career: Jari Kurri, +101
Best ± rating one playoff season: Wayne Gretzky (1984–85), +27
Best ± rating, playoff game: Pat Stapleton and Bill White (April 25, 1971), and Brad Park (April 20, 1983), +7
Worst ± rating playoffs career: Tomas Sandstrom, -45
Worst ± rating one playoff season: Paul Reinhart (1982–83), -16

Power-play goals
Most power-play goals, career: Alexander Ovechkin, 285 
Most power-play goals, one season: Tim Kerr (1985–86), 34
Most power-play goals, one season for a defenseman: Sheldon Souray (2006–07), 19
Most power-play goals, career playoffs: Brett Hull 38,
Most power-play goals, one playoff season: Mike Bossy, (1981), and Cam Neely, (1991), 9
Most power-play goals, one playoff series: Chris Kontos (seven-game series), (1989), 6
Most power-play goals, one playoff game: Syd Howe (March 23, 1939), Sid Smith (April 10, 1949), Phil Esposito (April 2, 1969), Johnny Bucyk (April 2, 1969), Denis Potvin (April 17, 1981), Tim Kerr (April 13, 1985), Jari Kurri (April 3, 1987), Mark Johnson (April 22, 1988), Dino Ciccarelli (April 29, 1993, May 11, 1995) and Valeri Kamensky (April 24, 1997), Jonathan Toews (May 7, 2010), 3
Most power-play goals, one playoff game period: Tim Kerr (April 13, 1985), 3
Most power-play goals, rookie Joe Nieuwendyk (1987–88) 31

Shorthanded goals
Most shorthanded goals, career: Wayne Gretzky, 73
Most shorthanded goals, career playoffs: Mark Messier, 14
Most shorthanded goals, one season: Mario Lemieux (1988–89), 13
Most shorthanded goals, one playoff season: Derek Sanderson (1969), Bill Barber (1980), Lorne Henning (1980), Wayne Gretzky (1983), Wayne Presley (1989), Todd Marchant (1997), and Tobias Rieder (2020) 3
Most shorthanded goals, one playoff series: Bill Barber (five-game series) (1980) and Wayne Presley (six-game series) (1989), 3
Most shorthanded goals, one game: Theoren Fleury (March 9, 1991), 3
Most shorthanded goals, rookie: Jordan Staal (2006–07), 7
Most two-man shorthanded goals, career: Mike Richards, 3

Overtime
Most overtime goals, career: Alexander Ovechkin, 24 
Most playoff overtime goals, career: Joe Sakic, 8
Most overtime assists, career: Henrik Sedin, 23
Most playoff overtime assists, career: Brian Skrudland, Doug Gilmour and Joe Sakic, 6 
Most overtime points, career: Patrik Elias, 37 
Most playoff overtime points, career: Joe Sakic, 14
Most overtime goals, season: Steven Stamkos (2011–12), Jonathan Toews (2015–16), Alex Galchenyuk (2016–17), and Brad Marchand (2017–18), 5
Most overtime goals by a rookie, season: Shayne Gostisbehere, 4
Most overtime goals, playoffs season: Mel Hill, Maurice Richard, and Corey Perry 3
Most overtime goals, one playoff series: Mel Hill, 3
Most consecutive overtime goals: Andrew Cogliano (2007–08) and Nathan Horton (2010–11), 3

Goals/assists/points by position
Most goals by a centre, career: Wayne Gretzky, 894
Most goals by a centre, one season: Wayne Gretzky (1981–82), 92
Most assists by a centre, career: Wayne Gretzky, 1,963
Most assists by a centre, one season: Wayne Gretzky (1985–86), 163
Most points by a centre, career: Wayne Gretzky, 2,857
Most points by a centre, one season: Wayne Gretzky (1985–86), 215
Most goals by a left wing, career: Alexander Ovechkin, 780 
Most goals by a left wing, one season: Alexander Ovechkin (2007–08), 65
Most assists by a left wing, career: John Bucyk, 813
Most assists by a left wing, one season: Jonathan Huberdeau (2021–22), 85
Most points by a left wing, career: Alexander Ovechkin, 1,410
Most points by a left wing, one season: Luc Robitaille (1992–93), 125
Most goals by a right wing, career: Gordie Howe, 801
Most goals by a right wing, one season: Brett Hull (1990–91), 86
Most assists by a right wing, career: Jaromir Jagr, 1,155
Most assists by a right wing, one season: Jaromir Jagr (1995–96) and Nikita Kucherov (2018-19),  87
Most points by a right wing, career: Jaromir Jagr, 1,921
Most points by a right wing, one season: Jaromir Jagr (1995–96), 149
Most goals by a defenseman, career: Ray Bourque, 410
Most goals by a defenseman, one season: Paul Coffey (1985–86), 48
Most goals by a defenseman, one game: Ian Turnbull (February 2, 1977), 5
Most assists by a defenseman, career: Ray Bourque, 1,169
Most assists by a defenseman, one season: Bobby Orr (1970–71), 102
Most assists by a defenseman, one game: Babe Pratt (January 8, 1944), Pat Stapleton (March 30, 1969), Bobby Orr (January 1, 1973), Ron Stackhouse (March 8, 1975), Paul Coffey (March 14, 1986), and Gary Suter, (April 4, 1986), 6
Most points by a defenseman, career: Ray Bourque, 1,579
Most points by a defenseman, one season: Bobby Orr (1970–71), 139
Most points by a defenseman, one game: Tom Bladon (December 11, 1977) and Paul Coffey (March 14, 1986), 8
Most points by a defenseman, one playoff year: Paul Coffey (1985), 37
Most goals by a goaltender regular season career: Martin Brodeur (February 15, 2000 & March 21, 2013), 2
Most goals by a goaltender in the playoffs: Ron Hextall (April 11, 1989) and Martin Brodeur (April 17, 1997), 1
Most goals by a goaltender career, including playoffs: Martin Brodeur, 3
Most assists by a goaltender, one season: Grant Fuhr, (1983–84) 14
Most assists by a goaltender, regular season career: Tom Barrasso, 48
Most assists by a goaltender playoffs one season Martin Brodeur (2011–12), 4
Most assists by a goaltender, playoffs career: Grant Fuhr, 14
Most assists by a goaltender, career, including playoffs: Grant Fuhr (46 regular season, 14 playoffs), 60
Most assists by a goaltender, one game Jeff Reese (February 10, 1993), 3 
Most points by a goaltender, one season: Grant Fuhr (1983–84), 14 - all assists
Most points by a goaltender regular season career: Tom Barrasso, 48 - all assists
Most points by a goaltender career, including playoffs Grant Fuhr (46 regular season, 14 playoffs), 60
Most points by a goaltender regular season one game: Jeff Reese (February 10, 1993), 3 - all assists
Most points by a goaltender playoffs one season Martin Brodeur (2011–12), 4 - all assists
Most points by a goaltender, one period: Jeff Reese (February 10, 1993), 3 - all assists

Records by a rookie
Most goals by a rookie, one season: Teemu Selanne (1992–93), 76
Most goals by a player in his first NHL season, one game: Joe Malone (December 19, 1917, January 12, 1918 and February 2, 1918), Howie Meeker (January 8, 1947) and Don Murdoch (October 12, 1976), 5
Most goals by a player in his first NHL game: Joe Malone (December 19, 1917), 5
Most goals by a rookie in his first NHL game: Auston Matthews (October 12, 2016), 4
Most assists by a rookie, one season: Peter Stastny (1980–81) and Joe Juneau (1992–93), 70
Most assists by a player in his first NHL season, one game: Wayne Gretzky (February 15, 1980), 7
Most assists by a player in his first NHL game: Dutch Reibel (October 8, 1953), 4
Most points by a rookie, one season: Teemu Selanne (1992–93), 132
Most goals by a rookie, one playoff season: Dino Ciccarelli (1981), 14
Most assists by a rookie, one playoff season: Marian Stastny and Ville Leino (2010), 14
Most points by a rookie, one playoff season: Dino Ciccarelli (1981), Ville Leino (2010), and Jake Guentzel (2017), 21
Most points by a player in his first NHL season, one game: Peter Stastny and Anton Stastny (February 22, 1981), 8
Most points by a player in his first NHL game: Al Hill (February 14, 1977), 5
Most points by a rookie, first playoff game: Dominik Kubalik (August 1, 2020), 5
Most goals by a rookie defenseman, one season: Brian Leetch (1988–89), 23
Most assists by a rookie defenseman, one season: Larry Murphy (1980–81), 60
Most points by a rookie defenseman, one season: Larry Murphy (1980–81), 76
Longest goal scoring streak in his first NHL Season: Joe Malone (1917–18), 14 games
Longest point streak by a rookie, one season: Paul Stastny (February 3, 2007 – March 17, 2007), 20 games
Longest point streak by an eighteen-year-old: Nathan MacKinnon (January 10, 2014 – March 6, 2014), 13 games
Longest point streak by a rookie defenseman: Shayne Gostisbehere (January 19, 2016 – February 20, 2016), 15 games

Points/goals/assists per game average
Highest goals-per-game average, career (among players with 200-or-more goals): Mike Bossy, .762
Highest goals-per-game average including playoffs, career (among players with 200-or-more goals): Mario Lemieux, .749
Highest goals-per-game average, one season (among players with 20-or-more goals): Joe Malone (1917–18), 2.20
Highest goals-per-game average, one season (among players with 50-or-more goals): Wayne Gretzky (1983–84), 1.18
Highest assists-per-game average, career (among players with 300-or-more assists): Wayne Gretzky, 1.320
Highest assists-per-game average, one season (among players with 35-or-more assists): Wayne Gretzky (1985–86), 2.04
Highest points-per-game average, career (among players with 500-or-more points): Wayne Gretzky, 1.921
Highest points-per-game average, one season (among players with 50-or-more-points): Wayne Gretzky (1983–84), 2.77

Milestone goal seasons
Most 20-or-more goal seasons: Gordie Howe, 22
Most consecutive 20-or-more goal seasons: Gordie Howe (1949–1971), 22
Most 30-or-more goal seasons: Mike Gartner, 17
Most consecutive 30-or-more goal seasons: Mike Gartner (1979–1994) Jaromir Jagr (1991–2007) and Alexander Ovechkin (2005–2020), 15
Most 40-or-more goal seasons: Wayne Gretzky and Alexander Ovechkin, 12
Most consecutive 40-or-more goal seasons: Wayne Gretzky (1979–1991), 12
Most 50-or-more goal seasons: Mike Bossy, Wayne Gretzky, and Alexander Ovechkin 9
Most consecutive 50-or-more goal seasons: Mike Bossy (1977–1986), 9
Most 60-or-more goal seasons: Mike Bossy and Wayne Gretzky, 5
Most consecutive 60-or-more goal seasons: Wayne Gretzky (1981–1984), 4
Most 70-or-more goal seasons: Wayne Gretzky, 4
Most consecutive 70-or more goal seasons: Wayne Gretzky (1981–1984), 4
Most 80-or-more goal seasons: Wayne Gretzky, 2
Most 90-or-more goal seasons: Wayne Gretzky, 1

Hat trick or better games
Most three-or-more goal games, career: Wayne Gretzky, 50
Most three-or-more goal games, playoffs career: Wayne Gretzky, 10
Most three-or-more goal games, one season: Wayne Gretzky (1981–82 and 1983–84), 10
Most three-or-more goal games, one playoffs season: Jari Kurri (1985), 4
Most three-or-more goal games, one playoff series: Jari Kurri (1985), 3
Most four-or-more goal games, one season: Joe Malone (1917–18), 5
Most five-or-more goal games, one season: Joe Malone (1917–18), 3

Goal/assist/point streaks
Longest consecutive goal-scoring streak from start of NHL career: Joe Malone (1917–18), 14 games
Longest consecutive goal-scoring streak: Punch Broadbent, 16 games (1921–22)
Longest consecutive goal-scoring streak, one playoff season: Reggie Leach 10 games (1976)
Longest consecutive goal-scoring streak by a defenseman: Mike Green (2008–09), 8 games
Longest consecutive assist-scoring streak: Wayne Gretzky (1990–91), 23 games
Longest consecutive point-scoring streak: Wayne Gretzky (1983–84), 51 games
Longest consecutive point-scoring streak, one playoff season: Bryan Trottier (1981), 18 games
Longest consecutive point-scoring streak, multiple playoff seasons: Bryan Trottier (1980, 1981, 1982), 27 games
Longest consecutive point-scoring streak from start of season: Wayne Gretzky (1983–84), 51 games
Longest consecutive point-scoring streak by a defenseman from start of season: John-Michael Liles  (2010–11), 9 games
Longest consecutive point-scoring streak by a defenseman: Paul Coffey (1985–86), 28 games
Longest consecutive point-scoring streak by a rookie forward: Paul Stastny (2006–07), 20 games
Longest consecutive point-scoring streak by a rookie defenseman: Shayne Gostisbehere (2015–16), 15 games
Longest consecutive point-scoring streak by a teenager: Patrik Laine (2017–18), 15 games

Fastest goals
Fastest goal from start of game: Merlyn Phillips (December 29, 1926), Doug Smail (December 20, 1981), Bryan Trottier (March 22, 1984), and Alexander Mogilny (December 21, 1991), 5 seconds
Fastest goal from start of game, playoffs: Don Kozak (April 17, 1977), 6 seconds
Fastest goal from start of period: Claude Provost (November 9, 1957), Denis Savard (January 12, 1986), and James van Riemsdyk (March 28, 2014), 4 seconds
Fastest goal from start of period, playoffs: Don Kozak (April 17, 1977), and Pelle Eklund (April 25, 1989), 6 seconds
Fastest goal by a player in his first NHL game: Gabriel Vilardi (February 20, 2020), 10 seconds
Fastest two goals from start of game: Mike Knuble (February 14, 2003), 27 seconds
Fastest two goals from start of game, playoffs: Dick Duff (April 9, 1963), 68 seconds
Fastest two goals from start of period, playoffs: Pat LaFontaine (May 19, 1984), 35 seconds
Fastest two goals: Nels Stewart (January 3, 1931) and Deron Quint (December 15, 1995), 4 seconds
Fastest two goals, playoffs: Joe Malone (February 22, 1919), and Norm Ullman (April 11, 1965), 5 seconds
Fastest three goals: Bill Mosienko (March 23, 1952), 21 seconds
Fastest three assists: Gus Bodnar (March 23, 1952), 21 seconds
Fastest regular season overtime goal: Mats Sundin, Alexander Ovechkin, William Nylander, David Legwand, and Andreas Athanasiou, 6 seconds
Fastest playoff overtime goal: Brian Skrudland (May 18, 1986), 9 seconds
Fastest goal after being scored on: Doug Gilmour (December 19, 1987), and Mikael Granlund (January 5, 2016), 2 seconds

Shots
Most shots on goal, career: Ray Bourque, 6,206
Most shots on goal, playoffs career: Ray Bourque, 812
Most shots on goal, one season: Phil Esposito (1970–71), 550
Most shots on goal, one playoff season: Henrik Zetterberg (2008), 116
Most shots on goal, one game: Ray Bourque (March 21, 1991), 19
Most shots on goal, one playoff game: Daniel Briere (April 22, 2006), 14
Most shots on goal, one period: Evander Kane, 10

Hits
Most hits, one season: Matt Martin (2014–15), 382
Most hits, one playoff season: Blake Coleman (2020), 126
Most hits, regular season career: Dustin Brown, 3,632
Most hits, playoff career: Alex Ovechkin, 629
Most hits, one regular season game: Gary Roberts (March 10, 1999) and Zdeno Chara (November 3, 1999) 17
Most hits, one playoff game: Brenden Morrow (May 4, 2008), 19

Blocked shots
Most blocked shots, one season: Kris Russell (2014–15), 283
Most blocked shots, one playoff season: Anton Volchenkov (2007), 80
Most blocked shots, career: Kris Russell, 2015
Most blocked shots, playoffs career: Ryan McDonagh, 430
Most blocked shots, one game: Kris Russell (March 5, 2015), 15
Most blocked shots, one playoff game: Anton Volchenkov (May 12, 2007 and March 22, 2010) and David Savard (August 11, 2020), 11

Time on Ice
Most time on ice per game by a defenseman, one season: Chris Pronger (1998-99), 30:36
Most time on ice per game by a forward, one season : Pavel Bure (2000-01), 26:52
Most time on ice per game by a defenseman, playoff season (minimum 10 games): Chris Pronger, 35:52
Most time on ice per game by a forward, playoff season (minimum 10 games): Alexei Kovalev, 26:35
Most time on ice by a defenseman, one regular season game: Dennis Wideman (January 18, 2014), 38:05
Most time on ice by a forward, one regular season game: Vyacheslav Kozlov (October 10, 2003), 30:00
Most time on ice by a defenseman, one playoff game: Seth Jones (August 11, 2020), 65:06
Most time on ice by a forward, one playoff game: Jaromir Jagr (May 4, 2000), 59:08

Penalty shots
Most penalty shot goals, career: Pavel Bure, 7
Most penalty shot goals, playoffs career: Michael Frolik, 2
Most penalty shot goals, one season: Pavel Bure, 3
Most penalty shot attempts, career: Vincent Lecavalier, 13
Most penalty shot attempts, playoffs career: Mats Sundin and Michael Frolik, 2
Most penalty shot attempts, one season: Erik Cole, 5
Most penalty shot attempts, one game: Erik Cole (November 9, 2005), Max Pacioretty (February 6, 2009), and Auston Matthews (November 3, 2017), 2
Most penalty shots faced by a goaltender, career: Marc-Andre Fleury, 21
Most penalty shots faced by a goaltender, playoffs career: Dominik Hasek, 5
Most penalty shots faced by a goaltender, one game: Ben Bishop (October 8, 2015), Miikka Kiprusoff (March 4, 2011), Roberto Luongo (February 6, 2014), and Jonathan Quick (November 3, 2017), 2
Most penalty shots stopped by a goaltender, career: Marc-Andre Fleury, 15
Most penalty shots stopped by a goaltender, playoffs career: Dominik Hasek, 4
Most penalty shots allowed by a goaltender, career: Tomas Vokoun, 8

Penalties
Most penalties, one game: Chris Nilan (March 31, 1991), 10
Most penalties, one playoff game: Forbes Kennedy (April 2, 1969), Kim Clackson (April 20, 1980), and Dale Hunter (April 22, 1988), 8
Most penalties, one period: Randy Holt (March 11, 1979), 9
Most penalty minutes, career: Tiger Williams, 3,966
Most penalty minutes, playoffs career: Dale Hunter, 729
Most penalty minutes, career, including playoffs: Tiger Williams, 4,421
Most penalty minutes, one season: Dave Schultz (1974–75), 472
Most penalty minutes, one playoffs season: Chris Nilan (1986), 141
Most penalty minutes, one game: Randy Holt (March 11, 1979), 67
Most penalty minutes, one playoff game: Billy Coutu (March 7, 1923), Dave Schultz (April 22, 1976), and Deryk Engelland (April 17, 2015), 42
Most penalty minutes, one period: Randy Holt (March 11, 1979), 67
Most penalty minutes, one playoff period: Billy Coutu (March 7, 1923) and Deryk Engelland (April 17, 2015), 42
Most penalty minutes, career, in the Stanley Cup Final: Gordie Howe, 94

Goaltending
Most wins by a goaltender regular season career: Martin Brodeur, 691
Most wins by a goaltender playoffs career: Patrick Roy, 151
Most wins by a goaltender career, including playoffs: Martin Brodeur 804
Best winning percentage (minimum 250 played): Ken Dryden .740 in 397 games played
Best winning percentage (minimum 500 games played): Jacques Plante .610 in 837 games played
Most wins by a goaltender, one season: Martin Brodeur (2006–07) and Braden Holtby (2015–16), 48
Most wins by a goaltender, career, in the Finals: Jacques Plante, 25
Most wins by a goaltender, expansion team season: Marc-Andre Fleury (2017–18 Vegas Golden Knights), 28
Most wins by a rookie goaltender, single playoffs season: Jordan Binnington (2018–19 St. Louis Blues), 16
Most ties, career: Terry Sawchuk, 172
Most losses by a goaltender regular season career: Martin Brodeur, 397
Most losses by a goaltender playoffs career: Patrick Roy, 94
Most losses by a goaltender, one season: Gary Smith (1970–71), 48
Most losses by a goaltender, one playoff season: Ron Hextall (1987), Miikka Kiprusoff (2004), Henrik Lundqvist (2014), Ben Bishop (2015), 11
Most shutouts regular season career: Martin Brodeur 125
Most shutouts playoffs career: Martin Brodeur 24
Most shutouts by a goaltender, including playoffs, expansion team season: Marc-Andre Fleury (2017–18 Vegas Golden Knights), 9
Most shutouts, including playoffs career: Martin Brodeur 149
Most shutouts, one regular season: George Hainsworth (1928–29), 22
Most shutouts, one playoff season: Martin Brodeur (2002–03), 7
Most games appeared in by a goaltender, career regular season: Martin Brodeur, 1,265
Most games appeared in by a goaltender, career playoffs: Patrick Roy, 247
Most games appeared in by a goaltender career, including playoffs Martin Brodeur, 1,470
Most games appeared in by a goaltender career, in the Finals: Jacques Plante (Montreal-38), St. Louis-3), 41
Most consecutive complete games by a goaltender: Glenn Hall, 502 (1955–1962)
Most games appeared in by a goaltender, one regular season: Grant Fuhr, 79 (1995–96)
Most games appeared in by a goaltender, one playoff season Ron Hextall (1986–87), Jonathan Quick (2013–14) and Jordan Binnington (2018–19), 26
Most minutes played by a goaltender, career: Martin Brodeur, 74,380
Most minutes played by a goaltender, one season: Martin Brodeur (2006–07), 4,697
Least time played by a goaltender, career Jorge Alves Dec 31, 2016, 7.6 sec
Longest continuous shutout by a goaltender: Alec Connell (7 games, 2 periods) (1927–28), 461 minutes, 29 seconds
Longest continuous shutout by a goaltender at start of NHL career: Matt Hackett (December 6 & 8, 2011), 102 minutes, 48 seconds
Longest winning streak by a goaltender, one season: Gilles Gilbert (1975–76), 17 games
Longest winning streak to start a season: Jack Campbell (2020–21), 11 games
Longest undefeated streak by a goaltender, one season: Gerry Cheevers (24 wins, 8 ties 1971–72), 32 games
Longest undefeated streak by a goaltender in his first NHL season: Grant Fuhr (15 wins, 8 ties 1981–82), 23 games
Longest undefeated streak by a goaltender from start of career: Patrick Lalime (14 wins, 2 ties 1996–97), 16 games
Most 20-or-more win seasons by a goaltender Patrick Roy, 17
Most consecutive 20-or-more win seasons by a goaltender: Henrik Lundqvist (2005–2018), 13
Most consecutive 20-or-more win seasons by a goaltender to start a career: Henrik Lundqvist (2005–2018) 13
Most 30-or-more win seasons by a goaltender: Martin Brodeur and Patrick Roy, 14
Most consecutive 30-or-more win seasons by a goaltender: Martin Brodeur (1995–2008), 12 
Most consecutive 30-or-more win seasons by a goaltender to start a career: Henrik Lundqvist (2005–2012), 7
Most 40-or-more win seasons by a goaltender: Martin Brodeur 8
Most consecutive 40-or-more win seasons by a goaltender: Martin Brodeur (2005–2008) and Evgeni Nabokov (2007–10), 3
Most consecutive wins by a goaltender in his rookie season: Ross Brooks (1973–74), 12
Most consecutive wins by a goaltender in his first NHL season: George Hainsworth (1926–27), 11
Most losses by a goaltender regular season career: Martin Brodeur, 397
Most losses by a goaltender, one season: Gary Smith (1970–71), 48
Most home games played by a goaltender, one season: Roberto Luongo (2006–07), 41
Most shots faced by a goaltender, in a regular season game: Sam LoPresti (March 4, 1941), 83
Most shots faced by a goaltender, in a season: Roberto Luongo (2005–06), 2,488
Most shots faced by a goaltender, in a playoff game: Normie Smith (March 24, 1936), 92
Most saves by a goaltender career: Martin Brodeur, 28,928
Most saves by a goaltender playoffs career: Patrick Roy, 6,561
Most saves by a goaltender, including playoffs career: Martin Brodeur, 33,758
Most saves by a goaltender, in a regular season game: Sam LoPresti (March 4, 1941), 80
Most saves by a goaltender, in a playoff game: Normie Smith (March 24, 1936), 92
Most saves by a goaltender, in a playoffs overtime game shutout: Normie Smith (March 24, 1936), 92
Most saves by a goaltender, in a regular season shutout: Ben Scrivens (January 29, 2014), 59
Most saves by a goaltender, in a season: Roberto Luongo (2003–04), 2,303
Most saves by a goaltender, in a playoff run: Tim Thomas (2011), 798
Most saves by a goaltender, in a Stanley Cup finals series: Tim Thomas (2011), 238
Most saves by a goaltender, in a playoff game shutout that did not go to overtime: Thatcher Demko (2020), 48
Highest save percentage, in a regular season (minimum 30 starts): Jacques Plante (1970–71), .944
Highest save percentage, playoffs (minimum 10 games): Jonathan Quick (2012), .946
Most goals-against, one regular season game: Frank Brophy (March 3, 1920), 16
Most goals-against, one playoff game: Paul Bibeault (March 20, 1944), 11
Fewest goals-against, regular season (minimum 30 games): Alec Connell (1925–26), 42
Most goals-against, regular season (minimum 30 games): Ken McAuley (1943–44), 310
Fewest goals-against, playoffs (minimum 10 games): Jacques Plante (1969), 14
Most goal-against, playoffs (minimum 10 games): Kelly Hrudey (1993), 74
Lowest goals-against average, regular season (minimum 20 games): George Hainsworth, 0.92
Lowest goals-against average, playoffs (minimum 10 games): Frank Brimsek, 1.25
Highest goals-against average, regular season (minimum 20 games): Frank Brophy, 7.11
Highest goals-against average, playoffs (minimum 10 games): Murray Bannerman, 4.77
Most overtime wins: Roberto Luongo, 49
Most penalty minutes by a goaltender regular season career: Ron Hextall, 584
Most penalty minutes by a goaltender playoffs career: Ron Hextall, 115
Most penalty minutes by a goaltender career, including playoffs:  Ron Hextall (584 regular season, 115 playoffs), 699
Most penalty minutes by a goaltender one season Ron Hextall (1988–89), 113
Most penalty minutes by a goaltender one playoff season Ron Hextall (1986–87), 43
Youngest goaltender to win 50 regular-season games: Patrick Roy 22 yrs
Youngest goaltender to win 100 regular-season games: Patrick Roy 23 yrs
Youngest goaltender to win 200 regular-season games: Martin Brodeur 26 yrs., 1 mos 
Youngest goaltender to win 300 regular-season games: Martin Brodeur 29 yrs., 7 mos.
Youngest goaltender to win 400 regular-season games: Martin Brodeur 31 yrs., 10 mos.
Youngest goaltender to win 500 regular-season games: Martin Brodeur 35 yrs., 6 mos.
Youngest goaltender to win 600 regular-season games: Martin Brodeur 37 yrs., 11 mos.
Quickest goaltender to win 400 regular-season games: Henrik Lundqvist 727
Most Stanley Cup finals series played by a goaltender: Jacques Plante (Montreal: 8 (1953, 54, 55, 56, 57, 58, 59, 60); St. Louis: 2 (1969, 70)), 10
Most Stanley Cup consecutive finals series played by a goaltender: Jacques Plante (Montreal (1953, 54, 55, 56, 57, 58, 59, 60), 8
Fewest saves required in a win: Ryan Miller (Anaheim Jan. 25, 2018) 11:40 min; Antti Niemi (Dallas Dec. 12, 2015) 6:43 min; Richard Bachman (Dallas Mar. 29, 2013) 2:32 min; Craig Billington (Colorado Dec. 21, 1998) 1:52 min, (Colorado Dec. 31, 1996) 0:12 sec; Steve Weeks (NY Rangers Mar. 24, 1982) 0:17 sec 0

Shootout
 Most shootout goals in one season: Ilya Kovalchuk (2011–12), 11
 Most game-deciding shootout goals in one season: Ilya Kovalchuk (2011–12), 7
 Most shootout goals career: Jonathan Toews, 51  
 Most game-deciding shootout goals career: Frans Nielsen, 23  
 Highest shootout percentage (Minimum 15 attempts): Artemi Panarin, 59.4% (19/32)  
 Most shootout attempts in a season: Radim Vrbata, 18
 Most shootout attempts career: Patrick Kane, 122  
 Most shootout games played by a goaltender in a season: Martin Brodeur (2006–07), 16
 Most shootout games played by a goaltender career: Henrik Lundqvist, 111 
 Most shootout wins by a goaltender in a season: Ryan Miller and Martin Brodeur (2006–07), Mathieu Garon (2007–08), and Jonathan Quick (2010–11), 10
 Most shootout wins by a goaltender career: Henrik Lundqvist and Marc-Andre Fleury, 61
 Most shootout losses by a goaltender in a season: Tomas Vokoun (2009–10) and Tuukka Rask (2014–15), 9
 Most shootout losses by a goaltender career: Roberto Luongo, 58
 Most goals allowed in a shootout by a goaltender career: Roberto Luongo, 133
 Most saves in a shootout by a goaltender career: Henrik Lundqvist, 293

Age
Oldest Forward: Gordie Howe, April 11, 1980, 52 years, 11 days
Oldest Defensemen: Chris Chelios, April 6, 2010, 48 years, 71 days
Oldest Goaltender: Maurice Roberts, November 25, 1951, 45 years, 345 days
Oldest Player to play his first NHL game: Connie Madigan, February 6, 1973, 38 years, 94 days
Oldest Goalie to play his first NHL game: David Ayres , February 22, 2020,  42 years 194 days
Oldest Goalie to win his regular-season debut: David Ayres , February 22, 2020, 42 years, 194 days, as an emergency backup goaltender for the Carolina Hurricanes in a 6–3 win against the Toronto Maple Leafs
Youngest Player to play his first NHL game: Bep Guidolin, November 12, 1942, 16 years, 337 days
Youngest Goalie to play his first NHL game: Harry Lumley, December 23, 1943, 17 years, 42 days
Oldest Goalie to play in Stanley Cup Finals: Lester Patrick, April 7, 1928, 44 years, 90 days
Oldest Defensemen to play in the Stanley Cup Finals: Doug Harvey, May 11, 1968, 43 years, 137 days
Oldest Forward to play in Stanley Cup Finals: Mark Recchi, June 15, 2011, 43 years, 134 days
Youngest Player to play in the Stanley Cup Finals: Gaye Stewart, April 14, 1942, 18 years, 290 days 
Youngest Player to win the Stanley Cup: Larry Hillman, April 14, 1955  18 years, 68 days (played 2 games in Semi-finals, did not play in the finals)
Oldest Player to win the Stanley Cup: Chris Chelios, June 4, 2008, 46 years, 130 days (did not play in 2008 finals, so Doug Harvey keeps record for oldest defenceman to play in finals) 
Oldest Goalie to win the Stanley Cup: Lester Patrick April 14, 1928, 44 years, 90 days

See also
 List of NHL records (team)
 List of NHL statistical leaders
 List of NHL statistical leaders by country

References

Notes

Sources
NHL Official Guide and Record Book, 2016
www.nhl.com

Individual
Records (individual)